The United Association of Journeymen and Apprentices of the Plumbing and Pipe Fitting Industry of the United States and Canada, commonly known as the United Association (UA), is a labor union which represents workers in the plumbing and pipefitting industries in the United States and Canada.

History

Journeymen in the pipe trades in the 1880s worked in three basic crafts: plumbers, steamfitters and gasfitters.

The first truly successful national body, the United Association of Journeymen Plumbers, Gas Fitters, Steam Fitters, and Steam Fitters' Helpers of the United States and Canada, was officially founded on October 11, 1889.

Gradually, former members of rival unions joined the United Association. The depression of 1893–1897 slowed the development of a stronger organization. Membership in the United Association grew to 6,700 in 1893, but fell to 4,400 by 1897. Yet, by that year 151 local unions were listed on its rolls.

Starting in 1898, the construction industry entered a period of expansion and prosperity that lasted until 1914. From 1898 to 1906 the United Association quadrupled its membership.

During its first years, the United Association was essentially a federation of local unions, rather than a truly national union of the pipe trades. The major breakthrough toward a unified national organization came at the 1902 national convention in Omaha, when delegates approved a Nationalization Committee proposal establishing a comprehensive system of sick, death and strike benefits.

As such reforms to strengthen the national organization were being made in the early part of the century, however, some locals broke ranks to form a rival union. In August 1906, members of the secessionist union realized the futility of further rivalry and agreed to affiliate with the United Association.

From 1898 to 1914, the United Association went through several phases of a struggle with the International Association of Steam and Hot Water Fitters and Helpers, a prolonged and sometimes bitter dispute both over jurisdiction over a craft (steamfitting) and work assignments (plumbers vs. steamfitters). The conflict affected other building trades when walkouts by the rival steamfitting organizations, as a result of their jurisdictional dispute, led to work stoppages by other crafts.

The strength of the United Association, and favorable rulings by the American Federation of Labor, including the revocation of the International Association's charter in 1912, ended this jurisdictional battle, but other jurisdictional issues would continue to challenge the union.

New disputes arose over the construction of chemical plants and other manufacturing and service establishments that required extensive piping systems. Large volumes of newer types of pipefitting installation in the shift from World War I wartime industries to peacetime construction caused considerable difficulties. Jurisdictional problems also developed with other national unions, but the United Association retained jurisdiction over important, growing areas of work like construction of industrial plants, public utilities, petroleum facilities and residential buildings.

In the first half of the century, the United Association moved to formalize apprenticeship training programs, including making a five-year apprenticeship mandatory in 1921, and in 1938 holding that all apprentices be members of the United Association and attend related training classes. Its National Plumbing Apprenticeship Plan of 1936 was the first set of standards governing apprenticeship to win approval of the federal government.

In the Depression, United Association membership fell from its 1929 peak of 60,000 to 26,000 by 1933.

After several constitutional changes through the years, the 1946 convention changed the name of the organization to its present name: The United Association of Journeymen and Apprentices of the Plumbing and Pipe Fitting Industry of the United States and Canada.

Throughout World War II and after, the United Association made considerable gains in membership and prestige. Between 1940 and 1954 membership surged from 60,000 to 240,000 with veterans entering the skilled craftsmen field.

United Association member George Meany was elected in 1952 to be president of the newly formed AFL-CIO and was to provide a shaping force in the American labor movement until his death in 1980.

The New Frontier of President John F. Kennedy and Great Society of President Lyndon Johnson were movements supported by the United Association. With expanded training programs beginning in 1956, the UA was able to meet the demands of accelerated construction activity in the 1960s. With the increased work the slogan, "There is no substitute for UA skilled craftsmen" became widespread throughout the industry. By 1971 the UA was 320,000 strong.

Composition
According to UA's reports to the Department of Labor since 2000, the union has consistently had about 93 percent members in "building trades", the remaining 7 percent in "metal trades".  Out of the total membership, most are considered "journeymen", with about 12 percent considered "apprentices". As of January 1, 2017, fourth- and fifth-year apprentices are eligible to vote in the union.

Constitution
"The objects of this Association are to protect its members from unjust and injurious competition, and secure through unity of action among all workers of the industry throughout the United States and Canada, claiming, as we do, that labor is capital, and is the only capital that possesses power to reproduce itself or in other words, to create capital. Labor is the interest underlying all other interests; therefore, it is entitled to and should receive from society and government protection and encouragement."

Presidents
1889: P. J. Quinlan
A. Lee
William F. Redmond
John S. Kelley
1901: William M. Merrick
1906: John R. Alpine
1919: John Coefield
1940: George Masterton
1943: Martin Patrick Durkin
1953: Peter Schoemann
1953: Martin Patrick Durkin
1955: Peter Schoemann
1971: Martin Ward
1982: Marvin J. Boede
1997: Martin Maddaloni
2005: William P. Hite
2016: Mark McManus

References

External links

 

AFL–CIO
Building and construction trade unions
Canadian Labour Congress
Plumbing organizations
Trade unions established in 1889